Rico Theodorus Johannes Zeegers (born 19 January 2000) is a Dutch professional footballer who plays as a right-back for Eerste Divisie club MVV.

Career

Early years
Zeegers played youth football for Slekker Boys, Fortuna Sittard and PSV, eventually signing his first professional contract with the latter in 2019; a two-year deal. 

He made his senior debut for Jong PSV in the Eerste Divisie on 16 August 2019, starting at centre-back in a 3–2 away loss to Almere City.

MVV
He joined MVV on a six-month loan on 12 January 2021. He made his debut for the club on 15 January 2021, starting at right-back in a 3–0 away loss to Go Ahead Eagles. He provided his first assist on 12 April, a cutback pass to Jérôme Déom who slotted home for the 1–0 lead in an eventual 4–2 home loss to rivals Roda JC Kerkrade.

On 4 June 2021, the deal was made permanent and Zeegers signed a two-year contract with MVV. He suffered a foot injury during practice in November 2022, which required surgery. The injury ruled him out for several months.

Career statistics

References

External links
 

2000 births
Living people
Dutch footballers
Association football defenders
PSV Eindhoven players
Jong PSV players
Fortuna Sittard players
MVV Maastricht players
Eerste Divisie players
People from Sittard
Footballers from Limburg (Netherlands)